Alan D. Roberts is a Tun Abdul Razak Research Centre (TARRC) scientist noted for his contributions to understanding contact phenomena in elastomers, and in particular the JKR equation.

Education

Roberts completed his Doctor of Philosophy degree in 1968, having worked in the Cavendish laboratory at the University of Cambridge, under the supervision of tribologist David Tabor.

Career

His 1971 paper with Kevin Kendall and Kenneth L. Johnson forms the basis of modern theories of contact mechanics.

In 1974, Roberts was recruited to the Applied Physics Group at the Malaysian Rubber Producers' Research Association (MRPRA) by Alan G. Thomas.  He researched the sliding friction of rubber on wet surfaces and on ice, the effects of pH and salt concentration, and other effects.

In 1983, he was promoted to Assistant Director of MRPRA, and the following year to Deputy Director.

Awards

Roberts received the 1998 Lavoisier Medal of the French Society of the Chemical Industry, and in 2014 he received the Charles Goodyear Medal of the Rubber Division of the American Chemical Society.

References

Living people
Polymer scientists and engineers
British scientists
Year of birth missing (living people)
Tribologists